Md. Nazim Uddin was a Bangladeshi freedom fighter. He was awarded Bir Protik for his contribution to the Liberation War of Bangladesh'''.

Biography
Nazim Uddin's father's name was Arab Ali and his mother's name Misri Begum. He was in East Pakistan Rifles in 1971. After the declaration of independence of Bangladesh he decided to take part in the Liberation War of Bangladesh. He was appointed in Sholoshahar, Chittagong at that time.

Nazim Uddin and other freedom fighters joined with other freedom fighters of East Bengal Regiment in Brahmanbaria in April. They were in Ashuganj Upazila to protect the place from Pakistanis. He also attacked Dharampasha Thana of Sunamganj in guerrilla style along with other freedom fighters in May and got success. Later, he crossed the border and went to India. He trained new freedom fighters in India.

In November Nazim Uddin and other freedom fighters went to Golapganj, Sylhet from India. They destroyed the defence of Pakistanis in Komolpur, Golapganj. After independence he was awarded Bir Protik from Bangladesh Government for his contribution to the Liberation War of Bangladesh.

Nazim Uddin was married to Shamima Aktar. They had two daughters.

Nazim Uddin died on 2 May 2019 at the age of 84.

References

2019 deaths
Recipients of the Bir Protik
People from Kishoreganj District
People of the Bangladesh Liberation War
1930s births